The discography of James Bourne, an English singer-songwriter. Bourne has released four studio albums as a part of Busted, one album with Son of Dork, one solo album, and has announced a forthcoming solo album - Sugar Beach. Bourne has also released music under the pseudonym Future Boy.

Albums

James Bourne

Busted

Son of Dork

Future Boy

McBusted

Singles

James Bourne

Busted

Son of Dork

Other artists

References

Pop music discographies

Discographies of British artists